Major General Philip William Nuber (September 27, 1939 – May 21, 2003) of United States Air Force, was director of the Defense Mapping Agency from December 1994 to May 1996.

Early life and education
Nuber was born in Bozeman, Montana on September 27, 1939. He earned a BS degree in electrical engineering from Montana State University in 1962. Nuber graduated from the Air Command and Staff College in 1975 and the Industrial College of the Armed Forces the following year. He completed the University of Pittsburgh's Management Program for Executives in 1987 and Harvard University's National and International Security Management Course in 1991.

Air Force career
Nuber began active military service in March 1962, and earned his pilot wings in June 1963. His assignments included:
 4527th Combat Crew Training Squadron, Tactical Air Command, Luke Air Force Base, Arizona
 10th Tactical Fighter Squadron, Headquarters, U.S. Air Forces in Europe, Hahn Air Base, Germany
 510th Tactical Fighter Squadron, Pacific Air Forces, Cu Chi and Bien Hoa, South Vietnam
 Instructor pilot, 425th Tactical Fighter Training Squadron, Williams AFB, Arizona
 71st Tactical Air Support Group and 702nd Tactical Air Support Squadron, Fort Hood, Texas
 357th Tactical Fighter Squadron and 333rd Tactical Fighter Training Squadron at Davis-Monthan AFB, Arizona
 510th Tactical Fighter Training Squadron, Korat Royal Thai Air Force Base, Thailand
 358th Tactical Fighter Training Squadron, 355th Tactical Fighter Wing and 354th Tactical Fighter Squadron, Davis-Monthan AFB, Arizona
 Chief, Officer Command Assignments Division, Headquarters Tactical Air Command, Langley AFB, Virginia
 Commander, 425th Tactical Fighter Squadron, Williams AFB, Arizona
 Assistant deputy commander for operations, 405th Tactical Training Wing, Luke AFB, Arizona
 Assistant deputy commander (then commander), 833rd Combat Support Group, Holloman AFB, New Mexico
 Vice commander (then commander), 343rd Tactical Fighter Wing, Alaskan Air Command (AAC), Eielson AFB, Alaska
 Deputy commander, Air Force Combat Operations Staff, deputy director, operations, directorate for plans and operations, Headquarters, U.S. Air Force
 Deputy director, Office of Military Support, Headquarters U.S. Army
 Temporary deputy commander, Joint Task Force Middle East, United States Central Command, Middle East
 Assistant deputy under the Secretary of the Air Force (international affairs)
 Chief, Joint U.S. Military Mission for Aid to Turkey, Ankara, Turkey

Defense Mapping Agency

Nuber became director of the Defense Mapping Agency in December 1994, a post he held until May 1996. He brought the DMA to world attention when he provided the Global Geospatial Information System (GGIS) to President Clinton's Dayton Peace Accord to settle the boundaries of Bosnia, Croatia, Serbia, and Kosovo. The leaders saw three-dimensional satellite imagery and mapping data of their nations, enabling them to quickly resolve boundary issues.

As director, Nuber oversaw the agency's reinvention task force. Initiated by Nuber's predecessor, Major General Raymund E. O'Mara, the task force sought to transform the DMA from a map provider to a timely source of geospatial information and services. It presented Nuber with a proposal for a completely restructured agency based on three groups: Operations, Acquisition and Technology, and Installation. He embraced and implemented the changes, profoundly changing the DMA and enhancing its talent and tradecraft. Nuber retired June 1, 1996; after 34 years of service.

Death
Nuber died of cancer on May 21, 2003. He was buried at Arlington National Cemetery.

Awards and decorations
Nuber had more than 4,200 flying hours and was a veteran of three hundred combat missions. His
military awards and decorations include:
 Defense Distinguished Service Medal
 Distinguished Service Medal
 Legion of Merit
 Distinguished Flying Cross with bronze oak leaf cluster
 Bronze Star Medal
 Meritorious Service Medal with three bronze oak leaf clusters
 Air Medal with three silver oak leaf clusters and bronze oak leaf cluster
 Air Force Commendation Medal with two bronze oak leaf clusters
 Army Commendation Medal

References
Citations

Sources

 

People from Kent, Washington
United States Air Force officers
Recipients of the Defense Distinguished Service Medal
Recipients of the Air Force Distinguished Service Medal
Recipients of the Legion of Merit
Recipients of the Distinguished Flying Cross (United States)
Recipients of the Air Medal
National Geospatial-Intelligence Agency leaders
1939 births
2003 deaths
Burials at Arlington National Cemetery